Hadja Fatimata Ouattara (nee Sanon) is a Burkina Faso politician who has been Minister of Digital Economy and Postal Development since February 2017.

Early life and education
Ouattara attended Sainte-Marie College in the Bobo-Dioulasso neighbourhood of Tounouma and has a degree in computer engineering from the Polytechnic University of Bobo-Dioulasso and a Masters in computer network and multimedia from the International Centre for Applied Advanced Studies at Humber College in Canada.

Career
In 2005, Ouattara became the webmaster of the Burkina Knowledge Management Network and created the Burkinabè Association for Linux and Free Software. She was Technical Advisor to the ICT Ministry. She also worked for several NGOs and is a founding member of the African Free Software Network. During the transitional period after the 2014 Burkinabé uprising, she held the position of Technical Secretary for the Ministry of Civil Service.

Ouattara was appointed Minister of Digital Economy and Postal Development by President Roch Marc Christian Kaboré on 23 February 2017. In April 2017, she launched the construction of thirteen metropolitan fiber optic loops in each regional capital of the country, a 36 million euro project designed called "G-cloud", largely funded through the Danish International Development Agency. 

In June, she was one of the founders of the inaugural Francophone African Conference on Open Data and Open Government, with representatives from 22 African countries. In July, she opened the Second IT Forum Burkina Faso in Ouagadougou and affirmed the government's goal to fully computerize its administrative processes and provide universal access to digital technology for all Burkinabès.

References

Year of birth missing (living people)
Living people
People from Bobo-Dioulasso
Government ministers of Burkina Faso
Humber College alumni
Women government ministers of Burkina Faso
21st-century Burkinabé people